William P. Perry (born 1930 in Elmira, New York) is an American composer and producer of television and film. His music has been performed by the Chicago Symphony, the Saint Louis Symphony, the Detroit Symphony and the symphonic orchestras of Cincinnati, Minnesota, Montreal, Calgary and Hartford as well as the Vienna Symphony, the Rome Philharmonic, the Slovak Philharmonic, the RTÉ National Symphony of Ireland and other orchestras in Europe.

Biography
Born in Elmira, New York in 1930, he attended Harvard University and studied with Paul Hindemith, Walter Piston, and Randall Thompson. For twelve years, Perry was the music director and composer-in-residence at the Museum of Modern Art in New York, where he composed and performed as a pianist more than two hundred scores for the Museum's silent film collection.

TV work 
After working at MOMA, he produced a PBS television series, The Silent Years (1971, 1975) hosted by Orson Welles and Lillian Gish, which won an Emmy Award. Perry is often credited with having played a major role in the revival of interest in classic silent films.
 
For three years (1976–1978) he produced a national poetry series for PBS, Anyone for Tennyson, starring Henry Fonda, Jack Lemmon, Claire Bloom, William Shatner and Vincent Price among others. Fifty programs were presented over three seasons with more than three hundred poets represented. From these programs, he later developed and produced the four-part DVD series, The Poetry Hall of Fame" which he also hosted.

He was executive producer and composed the music for the Peabody Award-winning "Mark Twain Series" of feature films on PBS (1980–1985). These films, produced by Perry's Great Amwell Company in association with the Nebraska ETV Network, also won five Cine Golden Eagle Awards. Novelist Kurt Vonnegut introduced the series, which began with "Life on the Mississippi" and culminated with a four-hour adaptation of "Adventures of Huckleberry Finn." This version for the first time emphasized the book's darker realities.

Perry directed the first color commercial to be broadcast live coast-to-coast (during The Price is Right) and the first musical commercial ever produced and broadcast on videotape (during The Jackie Gleason Show).

Theater 
Perry's Broadway musical, Wind in the Willows, starring Nathan Lane, received a Tony nomination for its original score (1986).

His dramatizations of the works of Mark Twain have included a staged musical biography, Mark Twain: The Musical, that ran for ten summers (1987–1995) in his home city of Elmira and in Hartford, Connecticut. PBS produced a television version of the show. In 2009, LML Music issued a CD of the complete original cast recording.

Music 
His most prominent symphonic compositions include the Jamestown Concerto for Cello and Orchestra (2007), written to celebrate the 400th anniversary of the first permanent colony in America in Jamestown, Virginia. It was released on CD by Naxos Records with Yehuda Hanani as soloist and the RTÉ National Symphony Orchestra conducted by William Eddins. His Concerto for Trumpet and Orchestra was written for and recorded by Armando Ghitalla with the composer conducting. A Naxos recording called "Music for Great Films of the Silent Era" includes his Three Rhapsodies for Piano and Orchestra, the Gemini Concerto for Violin, Piano and Orchestra, written for the Albek Duo, and the suite, Six Title Themes in Search of a Movie. A second Naxos release, "Music for Great Films of the Silent Era - Part 2" includes the song suite Silent Film Heroines with mezzo-soprano Wallis Giunta; the Summer Nocturne for Flute and Orchestra with Timothy Hutchins as soloist; a Concerto for Ophicleide and Orchestra called Brass From the Past performed by Nick Byrne; and a World War One commemorative tone poem based on the film Hearts of the World.

For both silent film recordings, Paul Phillips conducted the RTÉ National Symphony Orchestra. Perry's most recent Naxos recording (2019) entitled "Toujours Provence: Music for Stage and Screen" includes the four-part suite: Toujours Provence: A Musical Guidebook for Orchestra and Piano and the full-length Wind in the Willows Ballet. Michael Chertock is the piano soloist, and Paul Phillips conducts the Slovak Philharmonic Orchestra and Choir. Perry's music is published by Trobriand Music Company.

Other activities and awards 
In addition to his film and musical work, William Perry has maintained a separate business life. In 2000, he and his wife, Marina Perry, founded Right Face Ltd., a skin care company distributing products throughout the world under the brand name Rosacea Care.

Over the years William Perry has won more than a dozen ASCAP Awards for his musical compositions, and in 1984 Elmira College conferred upon him the honorary degree of Doctor of Letters in recognition of his contributions to the field of Mark Twain studies.

Trobriand Music Company
The Trobriand Music Company is a music publishing company located in Pittsfield, Massachusetts, principally engaged in the publication and distribution of the musical works of Perry. Among the major works represented by Trobriand are Perry's Concerto for Trumpet and Orchestra, Summer Nocturne for Flute and Orchestra, the Jamestown Concerto for Cello and Orchestra, the orchestral suite from Life on the Mississippi and the ballet The Wind in the Willows, based on the Broadway stage musical that starred Nathan Lane. Trobriand Music is also the publisher and licensor of the Mark Twain stage musical Mark Twain: The Musical, for which William Perry wrote the music and lyrics.

A number of major composers and arrangers have contributed their talents to the compositions represented in the Trobriand catalogue. Included among these are William David Brohn, Richard Hayman, Peter Breiner, Donald Sosin and Robert Nowak.

Trobriand has also commissioned works for important contemporary soloists. This includes a Trumpet Concerto for Armando Ghitalla, the Jamestown Concerto for Cello and Orchestra for Yehuda Hanani, the Summer Nocturne for flutist Keith Bryan and the Gemini Concerto for Violin, Piano and Orchestra for the Albek Duo.

The company has been affiliated with the American Society of Composers, Authors and Publishers (ASCAP) since 1975. Trobriand publications are represented on a number of record labels including Naxos, Bridge, Opus, Premier, and LML Music.

Recent Discography
Armando Ghitalla: A Trumpet Legacy   William Perry, composer and conductor  (Bridge 2007)
The Innocents Abroad    Mark Twain Film Scores   (Naxos, 2008)
Jamestown Concerto    American Music for Cello and Orchestra   (Naxos, 2008)
Mr. Mark Twain    Original Cast Recording    (LML  2009)
The Romance of the Silver Screen     (Naxos, 2009)

List of works

Stage musicals 
 On the Double (1946)
 Xanadu: The Marco Polo Musical (1953)
 Happily Ever After (1967)
 Wind in the Willows (1985)
 Mark Twain: The Musical (1987)

Film and television scores 
 Life on the Mississippi  (1980)
 The Private History of a Campaign That Failed (1981)
 The Mysterious Stranger (1982)
 The Innocents Abroad (1983)
 Pudd'nhead Wilson (1984)
 Adventures of Huckleberry Finn (1985)

Silent film scores (selection) 
 The Gold Rush
 The General
 Steamboat Bill, Jr.
 The Mark of Zorro
 Blood and Sand
 Orphans of the Storm
 The Beloved Rogue
 Down to the Sea in Ships
 Hearts of the World
 College
 It
 Broken Blossoms
 The Black Pirate
 Sparrows
 Way Down East
 The Iron Horse
 Metropolis
 Show People
 Tempest
 Intolerance
 The Last Laugh
 Storm Over Asia
 Stella Dallas
 Seventh Heaven
 What Price Glory?

Major orchestral works 
 Concerto for Trumpet and Orchestra (1986)
 Two Dance Pieces for Trumpet and Orchestra (1986)
 Summer Nocturne for Flute and Orchestra (1988)
 Life on the Mississippi Suite (1992)
 The Horse-Cavalry Suite (1998)
 Jamestown Concerto for Cello and Orchestra (2007)
 Six Title Themes in Search of a Movie (2008)
 Gemini Concerto: An Entertainment for Violin, Piano and Orchestra (2009)
 The Silent Years: Three Rhapsodies for Piano and Orchestra (2010)
 Brass from the Past: Concerto for Ophicleide and Orchestra (2012)
 Silent Film Heroines: A Song-Suite for Mezzo Soprano and Orchestra (2013)
 Market Street Overture (2014)
 Hearts of the World (2014)
 Wind in the Willows Ballet (2015)
 Pioneer Valley: The First Frontier (2016)
 Swordplay! A Curtain-Raiser (2017)
 Fiona (2018)
 Toujours Provence: A Musical Guidebook for Orchestra and Piano (2018)

Discography

The Beloved Rogue and other scores from The Silent Years   William Perry, piano  (Premier Recordings 1994)
Armando Ghitalla: A Trumpet Legacy   William Perry, composer and conductor  (Bridge 2007)
The Innocents Abroad    Mark Twain Film Scores   (Naxos, 2008)
Jamestown Concerto    American Music for Cello and Orchestra   (Naxos, 2008)
Mr. Mark Twain    Original Cast Recording    (LML  2009)
The Romance of the Silver Screen     (Naxos, 2009)
Music for Great Films of the Silent Era   (Naxos, 2011)
Music for Great Films of the Silent Era Part 2   (Naxos, 2015)
Toujours Provence: Music for Stage and Screen   (Naxos, 2019)

References

External links

Trobriand Music 
rosaceacare.com
Poetry Hall of Fame
Website of composer William Perry
Website of the Broadway musical, Wind in the Willows

1930 births
American classical composers
American film score composers
American male classical composers
American musical theatre composers
Television producers from New York (state)
Harvard University alumni
Living people
People associated with the Museum of Modern Art (New York City)
People from Elmira, New York
Pupils of Paul Hindemith
Pupils of Walter Piston
American male film score composers